Westwood High School is an English language high school located in St. Lazare and Hudson in Quebec, roughly 24 km west of Montreal, Quebec, Canada.  The school is administered by the Lester B. Pearson School Board and is divided into a Junior Campus (in Saint-Lazare) and a Senior Campus (in Hudson).

History
On July 1, 2003, Hudson High School was divided into Westwood High School Senior Campus located in Hudson, Quebec which offers secondary III, IV, and V education, and Westwood High School Junior Campus located in St. Lazare, offering secondary I & II education. These two campuses serve the Hudson and St. Lazare areas, as well as 24 other surrounding communities, up to the Ontario border.
The land where the school is today was known as lot #P603, which the town of St. Lazare purchased from Mrs. Shirley Hunt and her brother David Hunt. The land had been in the Hunt family for several generations.  A referendum was also held, as some residents did not want the school to be built. It was what the local newspapers called "A ongoing saga"  but in the March 29, 2000 edition of the Hudson Gazette, the front page reported "New school on schedule"

Location
Westwood High School – Junior Campus is located in St. Lazare, roughly 24 kilometres west of Montreal, Quebec, Canada.

See also
Lester B. Pearson School Board
Saint-Lazare, Quebec

References

External links
 Lester B. Pearson School Board
 Westwood High School
 St. Lazare, Quebec
 Peaceful Schools International

English-language schools in Quebec
High schools in Montérégie
Lester B. Pearson School Board
Vaudreuil-Soulanges Regional County Municipality